"The mother of parliaments" is a phrase coined by the British politician and reformer John Bright in a speech at Birmingham on 18 January 1865.

It was a reference to England.  His actual words were: "England is the mother of parliaments".  This was reported in The Times on the following day.

The expression therefore is often wrongly applied to the Parliament of the United Kingdom because of the adoption of the Westminster model of parliamentary democracy by many countries of the former British Empire.

See also
 History of democracy
 History of parliamentarism
 Parliament
 Parliament in the Making
 Parliamentary system
 Prime minister
 Parliamentary sovereignty
 The History of Parliament

References

Further reading
 

1865 in England
January 1865 events
1860s neologisms
19th century in Birmingham, West Midlands
Parliament of the United Kingdom
British political phrases
Westminster system